Francis Putnam Burns (Born: February 6, 1807) was a pioneering piano maker in Albany, New York. Burns was born in Galway, New York and trained as a cabinet-maker. He learned the craft of piano-making from John Osborne at Meacham & Co. in Albany, and from 1834-1835 was partnered with Thomas Clemence in that city. He then began the F. P. Burns Company to manufacture pianos, and won a diploma in 1847 from the New York State Agricultural Society for "best piano". Although the firm nearly went bankrupt during the American Civil War, his son Edward returned on disability and saved the company. 

A Burns piano was reportedly the first piano in California. According to an 1884 article in the Santa Cruz Daily Surf: "It was made in Albany, NY by E P Burns [sic] and brought around cape Horn in the fall of 1849 by Capt Wilson, and was put together on the schooner where its delightful strains helped to vary the monotony of the long voyage. It was regarded as a great curiosity when it arrived in San Francisco and crowds flocked to see the instrument and listen to its melody."

References 
 Makers of the Piano: 1820-1860, Martha Novak Clinkscale, Oxford University Press, 1993, page 68. .
 Pianos and Their Makers: A Comprehensive History of the Development of the Piano from the Monochord to the Concert Grand Player Piano, Volume 1, Alfred Dolge, Courier Corporation, 1911, pages 287-288. .
 Transactions of the New-York State Agricultural Society for the Year 1847, Volume 7, New York State Agricultural Society, Albany, 1848, page 186.
 "Her pioneer piano", in the Santa Cruz Daily Surf, February 27, 1884, by Mrs. Frank Lewis, page 3, column 3.

Piano makers
Businesspeople from Albany, New York
1807 births
Year of death missing